Re-Up may refer to:

 Eminem Presents: The Re-Up, a hip hop compilation album
 Re-Up Gang, a hip hop group
 Re-Up Records, a hip hop record label
 Re-Up (magazine)